Windhorst may refer to:
 Windhorst, Kansas, American community

People with the surname
 Brian Windhorst (born 1978), American sportswriter
 Fritz Windhorst (born 1935), American attorney and politician
 Lars Windhorst (born 1976), German entrepreneur
 Rogier Windhorst (born 1954), Dutch astronomer and professor
 Stephen J. Windhorst (born 1957), American judge
 Uwe Windhorst (born 1946), German scientist

See also
 Windhurst
 Windthorst (disambiguation)